J. Dringwell Rymbai (26 October 1934 – 21 April 2022)  was a politician from Meghalaya, India.

Life
Born in a poor family, he had to discontinue education during his graduation. He became an assistant teacher in a government school. He later obtained a graduate degree as well as a degree in education (B. Ed. - Bachelor of education). He went on to become the head master in a government school.

He entered active politics in 1983 and contested elections to the legislative assembly of Meghalaya on the Congress party ticket from the Jirang constituency successfully. He was made the deputy speaker of the legislative assembly in the same year. He was re-elected as MLA of Jirang three times consecutively in 1993, 1998 and 2003. In 1993, he was elected the speaker of the Meghalaya Assembly. Since 1998, he has held charge of several ministries in the government.

He was regarded as a loyalist of the 2003-2006 chief minister D. D. Lapang. After dissidence over Lapang's leadership in 2006, he replaced Lapang as the Chief Minister of Meghalaya on 15 June 2006.

He served as chief minister until March 2007, when Lapang returned to office following a decision by the Congress Party.
He was married to Peggymon Pathaw and had five children, three daughters and two sons. J.D. Rymbai resigned from the Assembly and Indian National Congress on 4 January 2008.

Rymbai died on 21 April 2022, aged 88.

References

1934 births
2022 deaths
Chief Ministers of Meghalaya
Meghalaya politicians
People from Ri-Bhoi district
Speakers of the Meghalaya Legislative Assembly
Meghalaya MLAs 1983–1988
State cabinet ministers of Meghalaya
United Democratic Party (Meghalaya) politicians
Meghalaya MLAs 1993–1998
Meghalaya MLAs 1998–2003
Meghalaya MLAs 2003–2008